This is a list of 576 species in Acalles, a genus of hidden snout weevils in the family Curculionidae.

Acalles species

 Acalles abstersus Boheman, 1837 c
 Acalles acerosus Erichson, 1842 c
 Acalles achadagrandensis Stüben, 2002 c
 Acalles acutus Wollaston, 1864 c
 Acalles adamsi Broun, 1893 c
 Acalles aeonii Wollaston, 1864 c
 Acalles aeonisimilis Stüben, 2000 c
 Acalles affinis Meyer, 1896 c
 Acalles africanus Solari & Solari, 1907 c
 Acalles albistrigalis Broun, 1909 c
 Acalles albivertex Chevrolat, 1879 c
 Acalles albocinctus Fiedler, 1940 c
 Acalles albolineatus Wollaston, 1854 c
 Acalles albopictus Jacquet, 1887 c
 Acalles albovittatus Fiedler, 1940 c
 Acalles alcarazensis Stüben, 2009 c
 Acalles algiricus Pic, 1905 c
 Acalles allostethus Broun, 1893 c
 Acalles alluaudi Uyttenboogaart, 1940 c
 Acalles almeriaensis Stüben, 2001 c
 Acalles alpestris Broun, 1893 c
 Acalles altus Broun, 1909 c
 Acalles amplicollis Fairmaire, 1849 c
 Acalles anagaensis Stüben, 2000 c
 Acalles analcisoides Kirsch, 1888-89 c
 Acalles anceps Broun, 1921 c
 Acalles anchonoides Champion, 1910 c
 Acalles angulicollis Rosenschoeld, 1837 c
 Acalles angulipennis Hustache, 1936 c
 Acalles angusticollis Sharp, 1885 i c
 Acalles apicalis Boheman, 1837 c
 Acalles apogaeus Peyerimhoff, 1925 c
 Acalles apogeus Peyerimhoff, 1925 c
 Acalles aptus Meyer, 1896 c
 Acalles arctus Broun, 1881 c
 Acalles argillosus Boheman, 1837 c
 Acalles asniensis Stüben, 2003 c
 Acalles aspersus Hustache, 1936 c
 Acalles aterrimus Broun, 1909 c
 Acalles atroplagiatus Fiedler, 1940 c
 Acalles attenuatus Blanchard, 1851 c
 Acalles aubei Boheman, 1837 c
 Acalles aulacus Broun, 1893 c
 Acalles australis Broun, 1893 c
 Acalles balcanicus Meyer, 1908 c
 Acalles basalis Leconte, 1876 c
 Acalles batorligetiensis Kaszab & Székessy, 1953 c
 Acalles bazaensis Stüben, 2001 c
 Acalles bellieri Reiche, 1860 c
 Acalles berberi Stüben in Stüben, Bahr, Germann, Behne & Bayer, 2005 c
 Acalles bicarinatus Fiedler, 1940 c
 Acalles bicinctus Broun, 1914 c
 Acalles bicostatus Broun, 1921 c
 Acalles bicristiceps Broun, 1914 c
 Acalles bifasciata Gerst., 1860 c
 Acalles bifasciatus Gerstäcker, 1860 c
 Acalles bilineatus Fiedler, 1940 c
 Acalles binodes Broun, 1921 c
 Acalles binodulus Champion, 1910 c
 Acalles biokovoensis Stüben, 2008 c
 Acalles bisignatus Pascoe, 1874 c
 Acalles bistrigosus Fiedler, 1940 c
 Acalles bodegensis Stüben, 2000 c
 Acalles breiti Solari & Solari, 1908 c
 Acalles brevipennis Broun, 1921 c
 Acalles brevis Tournier, 1873 c
 Acalles brevitarsis Wollaston, 1864 c
 Acalles brisouti Reitter, 1885 c
 Acalles brookesi Broun, 1921 c
 Acalles brunneus Suffrian, 1872 c
 Acalles bullatus Boheman, 1837 c
 Acalles callichroma Perkins, 1900 i c
 Acalles camelus (Fabricius, J.C., 1792) c g
 Acalles campbellicus Brookes, 1951 c
 Acalles canescens Broun, 1881 c
 Acalles capiomonti H. Brisout, 1864 c
 Acalles carinatus LeConte, 1876 i c b
 Acalles carinicollis Tournier, 1873 c
 Acalles caucasicus Reitter, 1891 c
 Acalles cavicollis Champion, 1905 c
 Acalles cayennensis Rheinheimer, 2007 c
 Acalles cazorlaensis Stüben, 2004 c
 Acalles cedroensis Kulbe in Stüben, 2000 c
 Acalles certus Broun, 1880 c
 Acalles chaudoiri Hochh., 1847 c
 Acalles chaudoirii Hochhuth, 1847 c
 Acalles chlorolepis Perkins, 1900 i c
 Acalles cicatricosus Boheman, 1844 c
 Acalles cilicicollis Broun, 1921 c
 Acalles cilicollis Broun, 1921 c
 Acalles cinerascens Blanchard, 1851 c
 Acalles cinereus Wollaston, 1860 c
 Acalles cinericius Champion, 1905 c
 Acalles cingulatus Broun, 1886 c
 Acalles cisalpinus Stüben, 2003 c
 Acalles clathrata J. Lec., 1876 c
 Acalles clathratus Leconte, 1876 c
 Acalles clavatus (Say, 1831) i c b
 Acalles clermonti Solari & Solari, 1905 c
 Acalles clunaris Chevrolat, 1879 c
 Acalles coarctatus Wollaston, 1857 c
 Acalles commutatus Dieckmann, 1982 c
 Acalles compactus Hustache, 1936 c
 Acalles compressus Fiedler, 1940 c
 Acalles comptus Broun, 1893 c
 Acalles concinnus Broun, 1893 c
 Acalles confusus Broun, 1914 c
 Acalles conicollis Broun, 1913 c
 Acalles conifer Erichson, 1842 c
 Acalles consors Broun, 1913 c
 Acalles contractus Broun, 1913 c
 Acalles cordaticollis Fiedler, 1940 c
 Acalles cordipennis Broun, 1881 c
 Acalles costatus Chevrolat, 1861 c
 Acalles costifer LeConte, 1884 i c b
 Acalles costipennis Fiedler, 1940 c
 Acalles costulatus Chevrolat, 1879 c
 Acalles crassisetis Champion, 1905 c
 Acalles crassulus LeConte, 1876 i c
 Acalles crenatus Hustache, 1936 c
 Acalles creticus Reitter, 1916 c
 Acalles cribricollis Pascoe, 1874 c
 Acalles crisioides Broun, 1881 c
 Acalles cristatiger Blanchard, 1851 c
 Acalles cristatus Broun, 1880 c
 Acalles croaticus H. Brisout, 1867 c
 Acalles cryptobius Broun, 1893 c
 Acalles cunctans Boheman, 1844 c
 Acalles curtus Hamilton, 1893 c
 Acalles cylindricollis Wollaston, 1854 c
 Acalles cynerae Vitale, 1903 c
 Acalles cytisi Stüben, 2004 c
 Acalles decemcristatus Broun, 1886 c
 Acalles decoratus Blackburn, 1885 i c
 Acalles delirus Pascoe, 1874 c
 Acalles delumbatus Chevrolat, c
 Acalles denominandus Solari & Solari, 1907 c
 Acalles denticollis Schoenherr, 1837 c
 Acalles dentigerus Broun, 1917 c
 Acalles dieckmanni Tempère & Péricart, 1989 c
 Acalles dilatata Cas., 1895 c
 Acalles dilatatus Casey, 1895 c
 Acalles diocletianus Bohem. in Schoenh., 1844 c
 Acalles discors Hoffmann, 1958 c
 Acalles dispar Wollaston, 1854 c
 Acalles distans Pascoe, 1874 c
 Acalles diversus Broun, 1886 c
 Acalles dolosus Broun, 1893 c
 Acalles doriae Pascoe, 1885 c
 Acalles dorsalis Broun, 1881 c
 Acalles dromedarius Boheman, 1844 c
 Acalles droueti Crotch, 1867 c
 Acalles dubius Solari & Solari, 1907 c
 Acalles dufaui Hustache, 1930 c
 Acalles duplex Sharp, 1885 i c
 Acalles echinatus Schoenherr, 1844 c
 Acalles editorum Peyerimhoff, 1913 c
 Acalles edoughensis Desbrochers, 1892 c
 Acalles episternalis Heller, 1935 c
 Acalles erinaceus Fiedler, 1940 c
 Acalles ernensis Broun, 1913 c
 Acalles errans Boheman, 1844 c
 Acalles erroneus Pascoe, 1876 c
 Acalles eruensis Broun, 1913 c
 Acalles eugeniae Perkins, 1916 i c
 Acalles euphorbiacus Stüben, 2000 c
 Acalles exaratus Champion, 1905 c
 Acalles exhumatus Wickham, H.F., 1913 c g
 Acalles expletus Pascoe, 1874 c
 Acalles extensithorax Rosenschoeld, 1837 c
 Acalles facilis Broun, 1893 c
 Acalles fallax Boheman, 1844 c
 Acalles farinosus Broun, 1898 c
 Acalles fasciculatus Boheman, 1844 c
 Acalles fausti Meyer, 1896 c
 Acalles favicollis Fiedler, 1940 c
 Acalles fernandezi Roudier, 1954 c
 Acalles ferrugineus Blanchard, 1851 c
 Acalles festivus Wollaston, 1857 c
 Acalles ficvorator Stüben, 2007 c
 Acalles figulinus Germ. in Dej., 1821 c
 Acalles fissicollis Penecke, 1926 c
 Acalles flavicaudis Colonnelli, 1994 c
 Acalles flavisetosus Broun, 1909 c
 Acalles flavomaculatus Voss, 1960 c
 Acalles floricola Broun, 1886 c
 Acalles flynni Broun, 1914 c
 Acalles flynsi Broun, 1914 c
 Acalles foraminosus Pascoe, 1874 c
 Acalles formosus Broun, 1898 c
 Acalles fortunatus Wollaston, 1864 c
 Acalles fossulatus Fiedler, 1940 c
 Acalles fougeri Hutton, 1898 c
 Acalles foveolatus Champion, 1905 c
 Acalles foveopunctatus Fiedler, 1942 c
 Acalles frater Perkins, 1900 i c
 Acalles frivolus Boheman, 1837 c
 Acalles frontalis Suffrian, 1872 c
 Acalles fuliginosus Fiedler, 1940 c
 Acalles fulvosparsus Fiedler, 1940 c
 Acalles fulvovittatus Champion, 1905 c
 Acalles furvus Broun, 1914 c
 Acalles fuscatus Broun, 1907 c
 Acalles fuscescens Blanchard, 1851 c
 Acalles fuscidorsis Broun, 1909 c
 Acalles fuscus Meyer, 1908 c
 Acalles gadorensis Stüben, 2001 c
 Acalles ganglbaueri Solari & Solari, 1908 c
 Acalles ganglionicus Boheman, 1837 c
 Acalles geophilus Lucas, 1860 c
 Acalles germanicus Letzner, 1882 c
 Acalles giraudi Mulsant, 1875? c
 Acalles globulipennis Wollaston, 1854 c
 Acalles globulus Meyer, 1896 c
 Acalles gonoderus Chevrolat, 1879 c
 Acalles gracilipes Solari, 1938 c
 Acalles gracilis Broun, 1913 c
 Acalles graëllsi Martínez, 1873 c
 Acalles grancanariensis Stüben, 2000 c
 Acalles grandicollis Boheman, 1837 c
 Acalles granellus Boheman, 1844 c
 Acalles granosus LeConte, 1876 i c
 Acalles granulicollis Tournier, 1875 c
 Acalles granulifer Boheman, 1837 c
 Acalles granulimaculosus Stuben g
 Acalles griseocaudatus Fairmaire, 1849 c
 Acalles grisescens Fiedler, 1940 c
 Acalles griseus Broun, 1886 c
 Acalles grossus Frieser, 1955 c
 Acalles guadarramaensis Stüben, 2004 c
 Acalles hakani Roudier, 1954 c
 Acalles haraforus Faust, 1887 c
 Acalles haraiorus Faust, 1887 c
 Acalles haraldi Roudier, 1954 c
 Acalles henoni Bedel, 1888 c
 Acalles hirsutus Hustache, 1936 c
 Acalles histrionicus Hustache, 1936 c g
 Acalles hopensis Broun, 1921 c
 Acalles horrens Champion, 1905 c
 Acalles horridulus Reitter, 1888 c
 Acalles horridus Broun, 1881 c
 Acalles hubbardi LeConte, 1880 c
 Acalles humeralis Perkins, 1900 i c
 Acalles humerosus Fairmaire, 1862 c
 Acalles humilis Blanchard, 1851 c
 Acalles hungaricus Hajóss, 1938 c
 Acalles hustachei O'Brien & Wibmer, 1982 c
 Acalles hypocrita Boheman, 1837 c
 Acalles hystriculus Pascoe, 1876 c
 Acalles hystrix Hustache, 1936 c
 Acalles iblanensis Stuben g
 Acalles icarus Heyden, C. von & Heyden, L. von., 1866 c g
 Acalles igneus Broun, 1909 c
 Acalles ignotus Blackburn, 1885 i c
 Acalles immansuetus Boheman, 1837 c
 Acalles impexus Pascoe, 1877 c
 Acalles impressicollis Hustache, 1936 c
 Acalles incanus Fiedler, 1940 c
 Acalles incognitus Hoffmann, 1956 c
 Acalles incultus Broun, 1893 c
 Acalles indigens Fall, 1907 i c b
 Acalles indutus Champion, 1905 c
 Acalles inflatus Blatchley & Leng, 1916 c
 Acalles ingens Broun, 1893 c
 Acalles innotabilis Perkins, 1900 i c
 Acalles instabilis Hustache, 1936 c g
 Acalles integer Broun, 1898 c
 Acalles interpositus Frieser, 1955 c
 Acalles interruptus Suffrian, 1872 c
 Acalles intutus Pascoe, 1876 c
 Acalles italicus Solari & Solari, 1905 c
 Acalles kabylianus Desbrochers, 1898 c
 Acalles kippenbergi Dieckmann, 1982 c
 Acalles koae Perkins, 1900 i c
 Acalles korbi Stierlin, 1890 c
 Acalles kroni Hustache, 1936 c
 Acalles kronii Kirsch, 1877 c
 Acalles krueperi Faust, 1890 c
 Acalles laevirostris Chevrolat, 1879 c
 Acalles lanaiensis Perkins, 1900 i c
 Acalles lanzarotensis Stüben, 2000 c
 Acalles lateralis Sharp, 1885 i c
 Acalles lateritius Suffrian, 1872 c
 Acalles latescens Champion, 1905 c
 Acalles laticollis Boheman, 1837 c
 Acalles latirostris Broun, 1886 c
 Acalles lecorrei Rheinheimer, 2008 c
 Acalles lederi Meyer, 1896 c
 Acalles lemur Schoenherr, 1837 c
 Acalles lentisci Chevrolat, 1861 c
 Acalles lepidus Kulbe in Stüben, 2000 c
 Acalles lepirhinus Broun, 1893 c
 Acalles leporinus Chevrolat, 1879 c
 Acalles leptothorax Perkins, 1900 i c
 Acalles leviculus Broun, 1881 c
 Acalles lifuanus Hustache, 1936 c
 Acalles lineirostris Broun, 1911 c
 Acalles lineolatus Blanchard, 1851 c
 Acalles lituratus Blanchard, 1851 c
 Acalles longipilis Voss, 1960 c
 Acalles longiusculus Fiedler, 1942 c
 Acalles longulus Leconte, 1876 c
 Acalles longus Desbrochers, 1892 c
 Acalles lugionii A. & F. Solari, 1907 c
 Acalles luigionii Solari & Solari, 1907 c
 Acalles lunulatus Wollaston, 1854 c
 Acalles lusitanicus Solari & Solari, 1905 c
 Acalles lutosus Fiedler, 1940 c
 Acalles machadoi Stüben, 2006 c
 Acalles maculatus O'Brien & Wibmer, 1982 c
 Acalles maculipennis Fiedler, 1942 c
 Acalles magnicollis Boheman, 1837 c
 Acalles major Meyer, 1908 c
 Acalles maniensis Blackburn, 1885 c
 Acalles maraoensis Stüben, 2001 c
 Acalles maritimus Broun, 1893 c
 Acalles maroccensis Stüben, 2001 c
 Acalles mauiensis Blackburn, 1885 i g
 Acalles mauritanicus Solari & Solari, 1907 c
 Acalles melanolepis Perkins, 1900 i c
 Acalles memnonius Pascoe, 1874 c
 Acalles menetriesi Bohem., 1844 c
 Acalles menetriesii Boheman, 1844 c
 Acalles merkli Meyer, 1896 c
 Acalles meteoricus Meyer, 1909 c
 Acalles metrosiderae Broun, 1910 c
 Acalles micros Dieckmann, 1982 c
 Acalles milleri Reitt., 1883 c
 Acalles minimus Blatchley, 1916 i c
 Acalles minus Broun, 1893 c
 Acalles minutesquamosus Reiche, 1860 c
 Acalles minutissimus Alonso-Zarazaga & Lyal, 1999 c b
 Acalles minutus Fiedler, 1940 c
 Acalles misellus Boheman, 1844 c
 Acalles miserabilis Suffrian, 1872 c
 Acalles moerens Fiedler, 1940 c
 Acalles moestus Blanchard, 1851 c
 Acalles monasterialis Stüben, 2004 c
 Acalles monstrosus Frieser, 1955 c
 Acalles monticola Perkins, 1900 i c
 Acalles moraguezi Desbrochers, 1898 c
 Acalles muelleri Stüben, 2000 c
 Acalles mulleri Reitter, 1883 c
 Acalles multisetosus Broun, 1907 c
 Acalles mundus Broun, 1881 c g
 Acalles mutillaria Gerst., 1860 c
 Acalles mutillarius Gerstäcker, 1860 c
 Acalles navieresi Boheman, 1837 c
 Acalles neptunus Hustache, 1936 c g
 Acalles niger Hustache, 1936 c
 Acalles nigripennis Perkins, 1900 i c
 Acalles nobilis Leconte, 1876 c
 Acalles nocturnus Boheman, 1837 c
 Acalles nodifer Wollaston, 1854 c
 Acalles nodiferus Wollaston, 1854 g
 Acalles nodigerus Broun, 1917 c
 Acalles nodipennis Pic, 1906 c
 Acalles nodulosus Boheman, 1837 c
 Acalles normandi Solari & Solari, 1907 c
 Acalles notoporhinus Broun, 1914 c
 Acalles nubilosus Wollaston, 1864 c
 Acalles nuchalis Leconte, 1876 c
 Acalles nucleatus Pascoe, 1874 c
 Acalles nudiusculus Foerster, 1849 c
 Acalles oahuensis Perkins, 1900 i c
 Acalles obesus Schoenherr, 1837 c
 Acalles obliquefasciatus Fiedler, 1940 c
 Acalles oblitus Wollaston, 1854 c
 Acalles oceanicus Stüben, 2002 c
 Acalles ochsi Solari, 1952 c
 Acalles ohioensis Sleeper, 1953 c
 Acalles olcesei Tournier, 1873 c
 Acalles opilio Klug, 1850 c
 Acalles orbiculatus Hustache, 1936 c
 Acalles orientalis Hustache, 1936 c
 Acalles ornatus Wollaston, 1854 c
 Acalles ovalipennis Petri, 1912 c
 Acalles ovalis Fiedler, 1940 c
 Acalles ovatellus Broun, 1881 c
 Acalles ovipennis Fiedler, 1940 c
 Acalles ovulum Fiedler, 1940 c
 Acalles paganettii Solari, 1952 c
 Acalles pallens Blanchard, 1853 c
 Acalles pallidicollis Perkins, 1900 i c
 Acalles palmensis Roudier, 1954 c
 Acalles papei Meyer, 1908 c
 Acalles parasierrae Stüben, 2002 c
 Acalles parvulus Boheman, 1837 c
 Acalles pascoei Broun, 1880 c
 Acalles paulmeyeri Reitter, 1901 c
 Acalles pectoralis Leconte, 1876 c
 Acalles pedestris Stüben, 2000 c
 Acalles peelensis Broun, 1913 c
 Acalles pelionis Frieser, 1955 c
 Acalles peninsularis Hustache, 1931 c
 Acalles peragalloi Meyer, 1896 c
 Acalles perditus Pascoe, 1874 c
 Acalles perjurus Fairmaire, 1849 c
 Acalles perpusillus Pascoe, 1877 c
 Acalles pertusus Boheman, 1837 c
 Acalles petryszaki Dieckmann, 1982 c
 Acalles picatus Broun, 1893 c
 Acalles pici Solari & Solari, 1907 c
 Acalles piciventris Broun, 1909 c
 Acalles pictus Wollaston, 1864 c
 Acalles pilicornis Dejean, 1836 c
 Acalles pilula Hustache, 1936 c g
 Acalles pilularius Fiedler, 1940 c
 Acalles plagiatofasciatus Costa, 1847 c
 Acalles planidorsis Blanchard, 1851 c
 Acalles planipennis Hustache, 1930 c
 Acalles plebejus Suffrian, 1872 c
 Acalles plicatus Broun, 1893 c
 Acalles poneli Stüben, 2000 c
 Acalles porcatus Broun, 1898 c
 Acalles porcheti Hustache, 1936 c
 Acalles porosa J. Lec., 1876 c
 Acalles porosipennis Fiedler, 1940 c
 Acalles porosus Blatchley, 1916 i c b
 Acalles portosantoensis Stüben, 2002 c
 Acalles portusveneris Mayet, 1903 c
 Acalles portus-veneris Mayet, 1903 c
 Acalles posticalis Broun, 1886 c
 Acalles posticatus Fiedler, 1940 c
 Acalles poverus Blanchard, 1851 c
 Acalles praesetosus Broun, 1909 c
 Acalles profusa Cas., 1829 c
 Acalles profusus Casey, 1892 c
 Acalles provincialis Hoffmann, 1960 c
 Acalles ptinoides Stephens, 1831 c
 Acalles ptochoides Suffrian, 1872 c
 Acalles pulchellus H. Brisout, 1864 c
 Acalles pulverosus Gemminger, 1871 c
 Acalles pulverulentus Wollaston, 1854 c
 Acalles pumilus Hustache, 1936 c
 Acalles punctaticollis Solari & Solari, 1907 c
 Acalles puncticollis Broun, 1898 c
 Acalles pusillimus Perkins, 1903 c
 Acalles pusillissimus Perkins, 1910 i c
 Acalles pyrenaeus Boheman, 1844 c
 Acalles quadrinodosus Fiedler, 1940 c
 Acalles quadrituberculatus Champion, 1905 c
 Acalles quercus Boheman, 1844 c
 Acalles querilhaci H. Brisout, 1864 c
 Acalles quietus Broun, 1893 c
 Acalles raffrayi Desbrochers, 1871 c
 Acalles reitteri Meyer, 1896 c
 Acalles reynosae H. Brisout, 1867 c
 Acalles roboris Meyer, 1908 c
 Acalles robustus Broun, 1909 c
 Acalles rolleti Germ., 1824 c
 Acalles rolletii Germar, 1839 c
 Acalles rotundatus Blanchard, 1851 c
 Acalles rubeter Er., 1842 c
 Acalles rubetra Erichson, 1842 c
 Acalles rubricus Broun, 1884 c
 Acalles rudipennis Fiedler, 1940 c
 Acalles rudis Broun, 1881 c
 Acalles ruficollis Broun, 1898 c
 Acalles rufipes Chevrolat, 1879 c
 Acalles rufirostris Boheman, 1844 c
 Acalles rufotuberculatus Champion, 1905 c
 Acalles rugirostris Champion, 1905 c
 Acalles rugosus Pascoe, 1885 c
 Acalles rugulosus Champion, 1905 c
 Acalles rusticanus Rosenschoeld, 1837 c
 Acalles ruteri Roudier, 1954 g
 Acalles sablensis Blatchley, 1920 i c
 Acalles samoanus Marshall, 1931 c
 Acalles sardiniaensis Stüben, 2001 c
 Acalles sarothamni Stüben, 2003 c
 Acalles saxicola Hustache, 1936 c
 Acalles scabricollis Fiedler, 1940 c
 Acalles scabrosus Leconte, 1876 c
 Acalles scapularis Chevrolat, 1880 c
 Acalles scitus Broun, 1880 c
 Acalles senilis Wollaston, 1864 c
 Acalles sentus Broun, 1886 c
 Acalles septemcostatus Desbrochers, 1892 c
 Acalles setaceus Fiedler, 1952 c
 Acalles seticollis Hustache, 1936 c
 Acalles setifer Broun, 1886 c
 Acalles setosus Fiedler, 1940 c
 Acalles setulipennis Desbrochers, 1871 c
 Acalles seychellensis Champion, 1914 c
 Acalles sierrae H. Brisout, 1865 c
 Acalles sigma Hustache, 1936 c g
 Acalles signatus Blanchard, 1851 c
 Acalles silosensis Stüben, 2000 c
 Acalles simulator Roelofs, 1875 c
 Acalles sintraniensis Stüben, 1999 c
 Acalles solarii Hoffmann, 1958 c
 Acalles sonchi Stüben, 2000 c
 Acalles sophiae Tschapek, 1873 c
 Acalles sordidus Leconte, 1876 c
 Acalles spureus Broun, 1881 c
 Acalles squalidus Boheman, 1837 c
 Acalles squamiger Suffrian, 1872 c
 Acalles squamosus Solari & Solari, 1907 c
 Acalles sternalis Broun, 1917 c
 Acalles sticticus Broun, 1921 c
 Acalles stipulosus Suffrian, 1872 c
 Acalles stöckleini Frieser, 1959 c
 Acalles subcarinatus Broun, 1910 c
 Acalles subcostatus Fiedler, 1940 c
 Acalles subfasciatus Rosenschoeld, 1837 c
 Acalles subglaber Rosenhauer, 1856 c
 Acalles subglobatus Desbrochers, 1892 c
 Acalles subhispidus LeConte, 1878 i c
 Acalles sublineatus Fiedler, 1940 c
 Acalles sulcatipennis Fiedler, 1940 c
 Acalles sulcatus Boheman, 1844 c
 Acalles sulcicollis LeConte, 1884 i c
 Acalles sulcifrons Suffrian, 1872 c
 Acalles suturatus Dieckmann, 1983 c
 Acalles sycophanta Fairmaire, 1849 c
 Acalles sylvosus Blatchley, 1916 i c
 Acalles sympedioides Broun, 1893 c
 Acalles syriacus Pic, 1900 c
 Acalles tagasaste Stüben, 2000 c
 Acalles tantillus Champion, 1905 c
 Acalles temperei Péricart, 1987 c
 Acalles tenellus Fiedler, 1940 c
 Acalles tenuistriatus Fiedler, 1942 c
 Acalles terminalis Hustache, 1936 c
 Acalles terminatus Klug in Dej., 1821 c
 Acalles terricola Broun, 1886 c
 Acalles terrosus Suffrian, 1872 c
 Acalles testensis Stüben, 2003 c
 Acalles teter Boheman, 1844 c
 Acalles theryi Hustache, 1936 c
 Acalles tibialis Hustache, 1936 c
 Acalles tigreanus Hustache, 1940 c
 Acalles tolpis Stüben, 2002 c
 Acalles tolpivorus Germann & Stüben, 2006 c
 Acalles tortipes Broun, 1880 c
 Acalles triangulatus Broun, 1886 c
 Acalles tricinctus Champion, 1905 c
 Acalles trinotatus Broun, 1880 c
 Acalles triseriatus Champion, 1910 c
 Acalles tristaensis Stüben, 2002 c
 Acalles tristis Blanchard, 1851 c
 Acalles truquii Champion, 1910 c
 Acalles tuberculatus Perkins, 1900 i c
 Acalles tuberculosus Blanchard, 1851 c
 Acalles turbatus Boheman, 1844 c
 Acalles turbida J. Lec., 1876 c
 Acalles turbidus Leconte, 1876 c
 Acalles uncatus Desbrochers, 1895 c
 Acalles unicolor Montrouzier, 1860 c
 Acalles uraeus Boheman, 1837 c
 Acalles vadosopunctatus Fiedler, 1940 c
 Acalles vafrum Broun, 1881 c
 Acalles vairum Broun, 1881 c
 Acalles validus Hampe, 1864 c
 Acalles variegatus Stephens, 1831 c
 Acalles variolosus Stierlin, 1887 c
 Acalles varius Gemminger, 1871 c
 Acalles vau Wollaston, 1854 c
 Acalles ventrosus LeConte, 1878 c
 Acalles veratrus Broun, 1883 c
 Acalles verrucifer Fiedler, 1942 c
 Acalles verrucosus Wollaston, 1863 c
 Acalles versicolor Fiedler, 1940 c
 Acalles vicarius Dan., 1906 c
 Acalles vividus Broun, 1880 c
 Acalles volens Broun, 1881 c
 Acalles vorsti Stuben g
 Acalles wilkesi Perkins in Bryan, 1925 c
 Acalles wilkesii Bryan (Perkins in), 1926 c
 Acalles wollastoni Chevrolat, 1852 c
 Acalles xanthostictus Broun, 1893 c
 Acalles xenorhinus Broun, 1898 c
 Acalles xerampelinus Wollaston, 1864 g
 Acalles zenomorphus Broun, 1917 c
 Acalles zumpti Uyttenboogaart, 1939 c

Data sources: i = ITIS, c = Catalogue of Life, g = GBIF, b = Bugguide.net

References

Acalles